Cockin is a surname. Notable people with the surname include:
 Frederick Cockin (1888–1969), Bishop of Bristol
 George Cockin (1969–1996), bishop of Owerri
 William Cockin (1736–1801), English schoolmaster and author